John Charles Badcock (17 January 1903 – 29 May 1976), also known as Felix Badcock, was a British rower who competed in the 1928 Summer Olympics and in the 1932 Summer Olympics.

Life
Badcock was born in West Ham and educated at Merchant Taylor's School. His family had been in business as boat builders and wharfingers on the River Thames for nearly a hundred years. Badcock became a member of Thames Rowing Club and had his first win at Henley Royal Regatta in 1925 in the Wyfold Challenge Cup. In 1927 he was in the Thames eight which won the Grand Challenge Cup and in the coxless four which won the Stewards' Challenge Cup. In 1928 he was again in the winning Thames crews in the Grand and Stewards at Henley. The Thames eight was then chosen to represent Great Britain rowing at the 1928 Summer Olympics and won the silver medal.

In 1932 he was again in the winning Thames crew in the Stewards Challenge Cup at Henley. The Thames coxless four was then chosen to represent Great Britain rowing at the 1932 Summer Olympics and won the gold medal in a hard race against the Germans. Badcock was appointed a vice-president of Thames Rowing Club in 1936.

In 1934, Badcock married the swimmer, Joyce Cooper, who had one silver and three bronze medals at the 1928 and 1932 Olympics. Their elder son, Felix Badcock, rowed for England at the 1958 Commonwealth Games and their younger son, Francis 'David', rowed for Oxford in 1958 as well as standing as reserve for the 1958 Commonwealth Games eight.

Achievements

Olympic Games
 1928 – Silver, Eight
 1932 – Gold, Coxless Four

Henley Royal Regatta
 1925 – Wyfold Challenge Cup
 1927 – Grand Challenge Cup
 1927 – Stewards' Challenge Cup
 1928 – Grand Challenge Cup
 1928 – Stewards' Challenge Cup
 1932 – Stewards' Challenge Cup

References

1903 births
1976 deaths
People educated at Merchant Taylors' School, Northwood
English male rowers
British male rowers
Olympic rowers of Great Britain
Rowers at the 1928 Summer Olympics
Rowers at the 1932 Summer Olympics
Olympic gold medallists for Great Britain
Olympic silver medallists for Great Britain
English Olympic medallists
Olympic medalists in rowing
Medalists at the 1932 Summer Olympics
Medalists at the 1928 Summer Olympics